The Am486 is a 80486-class family of computer processors that was produced by AMD in the 1990s. Intel beat AMD to market by nearly four years, but AMD priced its 40 MHz 486 at or below Intel's price for a 33 MHz chip, offering about 20% better performance for the same price.

While competing 486 chips, such as those from Cyrix, benchmarked lower than the equivalent Intel chip, AMD's 486 matched Intel's performance on a clock-for-clock basis.

While the Am386 was primarily used by small computer manufacturers, the Am486DX, DX2, and SX2 chips gained acceptance among larger computer manufacturers, especially Acer and Compaq, in the 1994 time frame.

AMD's higher clocked 486 chips provided superior performance to many of the early Pentium chips, especially the 60 and 66 MHz launch products. While equivalent Intel 80486DX4 chips were priced high and required a minor socket modification, AMD priced low. Intel's DX4 chips initially had twice the cache of the AMD chips, giving them a slight performance edge, but AMD's DX4-100 usually cost less than Intel's DX2-66.

The enhanced Am486 series supported new features like extended power-saving modes and an 8 KiB Write-Back L1-Cache, later versions even got an upgrade to 16 KiB Write-Back L1-Cache.

The 133 MHz AMD Am5x86 was a higher clocked enhanced Am486.

One derivative of the Am486 family is the core used in the AMD Élan SC4xx family of microcontrollers marketed by AMD

AMD has produced T-shirts that memorialize the Am486SX2-66.

Features

Am486 models

WT = Write-Through cache strategy, WB = Write-Back cache strategy

References

External links 

 AMD: Enhanced Am486 Microprocessors
 AMD: 30 Years of Pursuing the Leader. Part 2
 cpu-collection.de AMD Am486 processor images and descriptions

Am486
X86 microarchitectures